Hemenway is a surname. Notable people with the surname include:

Augustus Hemenway (1853–1931), philanthropist and public servant in Boston; son of E.A.H. Hemenway and M.T. Hemenway
David Hemenway, professor of Health Policy at the Harvard School of Public Health 
Edward Augustus Holyoke Hemenway, merchant; husband of M.T. Hemenway
Harriet Hemenway (1858–1960) was a Boston socialite who founded the Massachusetts Audubon; wife of August Hemenway
James Alexander Hemenway (1860–1923), United States Representative
John Francis Hemenway, founder of the Smith & Hemenway tool company
Mary Tileston Hemenway, philanthropist and wife of E.A.H. Hemenway
Robert Emery Hemenway, 16th chancellor of the University of Kansas

See also
Hemenway, Indiana, a community in the United States
Silas Hemenway Jennison
Hemenway Furniture Co. Building
Hemenway, a Japanese rock band.